Franco Lizzio (born July 21, 1963) is an Italian sprint canoer who competed in the early 1990s. At the 1992 Summer Olympics in Barcelona, he was eliminated in the semifinals of the C-1 500 m event.

References

1963 births
Canoeists at the 1992 Summer Olympics
Italian male canoeists
Living people
Olympic canoeists of Italy